Coppieters is a surname. Notable people with the surname include:

Bernice Coppieters (born 1970), Belgian ballet dancer
Fernand Coppieters (1905–1981), Belgian jazz and light music keyboardist
Francis Coppieters (1930–1990), Belgian jazz pianist
Honoré Jozef Coppieters (1874–1947), Belgian prelate
Maurits Coppieters (1920–2005), Flemish politician, after whom the Coppieters Foundation is named
Pierre Coppieters (1907–date of death unknown), Belgian swimmer

References